The Dominican Summer League Rangers or DSL Rangers are a Minor League Baseball team of the Dominican Summer League and Rookie affiliates of the Texas Rangers. They are located in Boca Chica, Santo Domingo, Dominican Republic. Since 2014, the team has been split into two squads, DSL Rangers 1 and DSL Rangers 2.

History
The team was established in 1989 as a shared affiliate of the Texas Rangers, Chicago White Sox, and Houston Astros. For 1990 and 1991, they were an independent Rangers affiliate. For 1992, they shared an affiliation with the expansion Florida Marlins. In 1993, they shared an affiliation with the Chicago Cubs. In 1994, they shared an affiliation with the Atlanta Braves. They became an independent Rangers affiliate again in 1995 and have remained so ever since. The team has split into two squads three different times in their existence: 1997, 2008, 2009, and since 2014.

In 2019, the Rangers opened a new $12.5 million organizationally owned Dominican Academy complex in Boca Chica. The complex includes three full size fields, a 18,500 square-foot clubhouse with lockers for 100 players, a 2,500 square-foot weight room, a 10,000 square-foot batting cage, and a 30,000 square-foot dormitory which accommodates 96 players and 29 staff members. Also included is a 90-seat dining hall and standalone office building.

Rosters

References

External links
Official DSL Rangers 1 website
Official DSL Rangers 2 website

Baseball teams established in 1989
Dominican Summer League teams
Baseball teams in the Dominican Republic
Texas Rangers minor league affiliates
1989 establishments in the Dominican Republic